Ministry of Environment  of the Republic of Poland was formed in 1973 to administer issues related to environment protection of Poland.

The ministry existed under various names since 1972. It has assumed its current name in 1999.

The last  Polish Minister of Environment was Michał Woś

See also 
 GreenEvo - Accelerator of Green Technologies

External links
 Ministry of Environment  

Environment
Poland, Environment
Poland
Environment of Poland
Poland, Environment
Poland
Forestry in Poland